The East Carolina Pirates baseball team is an intercollegiate baseball team representing East Carolina University in NCAA Division I college baseball and participates as a full member of the American Athletic Conference. The Pirates have made regular appearances in the NCAA Tournament. As of 2021, they have the most NCAA tournament appearances without a College World Series appearance.

The Pirates are coached by Cliff Godwin and play their home games at Clark-LeClair Stadium, named after donor and alumnus Bill Clark and former coach Keith LeClair. Every year, the Pirates host a baseball tournament in Greenville in honor of Coach LeClair called the Keith LeClair Classic.

History

Conference 
1948–1962: North State
1963–1965: Independent
1966–1977: Southern Conference
1978–1981: Independent
1982–1985: Eastern College Athletic Conference
1986–2001: Colonial Athletic Association
2002–2014: Conference USA
2015–present: American Athletic Conference

Head coaches 

* 1942, 1946–1949 No Records Available 
* 1943–1945 No Games Played

Stadium 

Clark-LeClair Stadium is the home of Pirate baseball at East Carolina University in Greenville, North Carolina. The stadium was named after Pirate alumnus and key contributor Bill Clark and former Pirate skipper Keith LeClair.

The stadium has 3,000 Stadium bleacher seats, plus space for several thousand more spectators in "The Jungle".  There are concession and restroom facilities at the stadium plus a family picnic area. Amenities include the Pirate Club fundraising and hospitality suite and a private suite for the LeClair family.

The stadium is home to the ECU Invitational and the Keith LeClair Classic.

Year-by-year results
* Division I only

NAIA tournament
In 1961, the ECU Pirates won the NAIA Baseball World Series championship to claim East Carolina's first national championship in baseball. The East Carolina Pirates won 13–7 over the Sacramento State Hornets.  Since then, the Pirates have yet to make it to a national championship.

NCAA tournament
The NCAA Division I baseball tournament started in 1947.
The format of the tournament has changed through the years.

Pirates in the Major Leagues
Over the 5-year tenure of current head coach Cliff Godwin, 14 Pirates have been drafted.
Since the MLB draft began in 1965, 2 Pirates have been selected in the first round: Pat Watkins was selected 32nd in 1993 and Jeff Hoffman was selected 9th in 2014.
A total of 20 Pirates have gone on to play in the MLB, 3 of which are active players.

See also
List of NCAA Division I baseball programs
Conference USA baseball tournament
American Athletic Conference baseball tournament

References